Supergene is a group of neighbouring genes on a chromosome that are inherited together because of close genetic linkage and are functionally related in an evolutionary sense. Supergene may also refer to:

Supergene (program), a computer program which allows the user to test a variety of plant genetics models
Supergene (geology), in ore deposit geology, processes or enrichment occurring relatively near the surface, as opposed to deep hypogene processes